Pennsylvania Railroad Office Building is a historic office building located in the University City neighborhood of Philadelphia, Pennsylvania. It was built by the Pennsylvania Railroad in 1927, and is a 14-story, brick and limestone building in the Classical Revival style.  It consists of a four-story limestone and terra cotta base, topped by a 10-story E-shaped tower of buff-colored brick.

It was added to the National Register of Historic Places in 2003. The building is currently known as University Crossings and provides student housing and office space for Drexel University.

Gallery

References

Pennsylvania Railroad
Commercial buildings on the National Register of Historic Places in Philadelphia
Neoclassical architecture in Pennsylvania
Office buildings completed in 1927
University City, Philadelphia